Sean Casey Daigle (born April 4, 1981) is a former Major League Baseball pitcher.

Professional career

Arizona Diamondbacks 
Daigle made his major league debut in 2004, giving up five home runs in less than three innings. , he is the only pitcher in Major League history to allow five or more home runs in his debut. He started 10 games for the Diamondbacks in 2004. His ERA was at 7.16 with a strikeout to walk ratio of 17/27 in 49 innings.

In 2005, he was sent down to Double A where he pitched out of the bullpen for most of the season.

In , Daigle pitched out of the bullpen in Triple-A Tucson, while appearing in 10 games with the Arizona Diamondbacks. During his time with the Sidewinders, Daigle starred on a TV show chronicling the life of a minor leaguer, along with Carlos Quentin, Chris Young, Bill Murphy, and Dustin Nippert.

Minnesota Twins 
Daigle signed with the Minnesota Twins in December 2007. He was released on August 25,  after posting a record of 1–5 in 44 games. His ERA stood at 3.78 in 69 innings.

Texas Rangers 
In December 2008, Daigle signed a minor league contract with the Texas Rangers. He was released during spring training.

Houston Astros 
In April , Daigle signed a minor league contract with the Houston Astros. He spent the whole season in AAA, appearing in 49 games. He was called up on June 1, 2010, for the first time since the 2006 season.

He was designated for assignment on July 18, 2010. He cleared waivers and stayed at AAA, finishing with a 4.91 ERA and 8 saves in 35 games.

San Francisco Giants 
On January 14, 2011, Daigle signed a minor league contract with the San Francisco Giants and pitched for AAA-affiliate Fresno Grizzlies. In his lone season in Fresno, he had a 5.97 ERA in 36 games.

Personal life
Daigle married softball pitcher Jennie Finch on January 15, 2005, at the Crystal Cathedral in Garden Grove, California. They have three children, sons born in May 2006, and June 2011 and a daughter in January 2013.

References

External links

Living people
1981 births
Major League Baseball pitchers
Arizona Diamondbacks players
Houston Astros players
Baseball players from Louisiana
Sportspeople from Lake Charles, Louisiana
Missoula Osprey players
South Bend Silver Hawks players
Lancaster JetHawks players
El Paso Diablos players
Tennessee Smokies players
Tucson Sidewinders players
Rochester Red Wings players